The 2009 Championship League Darts is the second edition of a darts competition—the Championship League Darts. The competition is organized and held by the Professional Darts Corporation and has a maximum prize fund of £189,000.

The format of the tournament is similar to the Premier League Darts tournament, also organized by the PDC, except it is contested by a larger pool of players who are split up into a number of groups.

Every match was watched on one of the ten bookmaker websites who broadcast the competition. The tournament was also available globally through the internet, except in the United States of America where it wasn't shown for legal reasons.

Format

The first group consisted of the top eight players from the PDC Order of Merit who were available for the competition. These eight players played each other over the course of a day and receive points for their performance. A win earned a player two points, unlike 2008 there was no draws. All matches were contested over 11 legs with a player winning the match when the reach 6 legs. When all players have played each other, the four players with the most points progressed to the semi-finals with the winners of those matches progressing into the final.

The winner of the final progressed to the winners group which took place at the end of the competition. The runner-up, losing semi-finalists and the players finishing fifth and sixth moved into group two, where they were joined by the next three players in the Order of Merit. The format of the second group was the same as the first group with players moving into the third group. In total there was 8 groups before the final group took place.

This format ensured that all players who do not win the group or finish in the last two positions had another chance to qualify for the winners group.

Qualification

Players must have been in top 29 places in PDC Order of Merit following 2009 World Matchplay Darts in order to qualify. Thirty places used because of Raymond Van Barneveld withdrawing.

PDC Order of Merit following 2008 World Matchplay Darts.

1. Phil Taylor  | 2. James Wade | 3. Raymond van Barneveld | 4. John Part | 5. Terry Jenkins | 6. Mervyn King | 7. Ronnie Baxter | 8. Adrian Lewis | 9. Colin Lloyd | 10. Alan Tabern | 11. Dennis Priestley | 12. Colin Osborne | 13. Wayne Mardle | 14. Mark Walsh | 15. Kevin Painter | 16. Andy Hamilton | 17. Robert Thornton | 18. Vincent van der Voort | 19. Denis Ovens | 20. Peter Manley | 21. Mark Dudbridge | 22. Jelle Klaasen | 23. Wayne Jones | 24. Andy Smith | 25. Roland Scholton | 26. Kirk Shepherd | 27. Co Stompé | 28. Tony Eccles | 29. Micheal van Gerwen | 30. Barrie Bates

Prize money

The prize money remained the same as last years tournament.

Groups 1–8
In groups 1–8 the prize money were as follows:

Group Matches – £50 per leg won
Play-off Matches – £100 per leg won

Winners group
In the winners group the prize money was as follows:

Group Matches – £100 per leg won
Play-off Matches – £200 per leg won
In addition the winners group had separate prizes for the winner, runner-up and losing semi-finalists. These prizes broke down as follows:

Winner – £10,000 and a place in the 2009 Grand Slam of Darts
Runner-Up – £5,000 and a place in the 2009 Grand Slam of Darts
Losing Semi-finalists – £2,500 each

Prize money won

The following table shows the amount of prize money that has been won by each player.

Tournament dates

The tournament took place over 9 days throughout September and October 2008. One group were played on each day. The dates were as follows:

Group 1 – Tuesday 15 September 2009
Group 2 – Wednesday 16 September 2009
Group 3 – Thursday 17 September 2009
Group 4 – Tuesday 22 September 2009
Group 5 – Wednesday 23 September 2009
Group 6 – Thursday 24 September 2009
Group 7 – Tuesday 20 October 2009
Group 8 – Wednesday 21 October 2009
Winners Group – Thursday 22 October 2009

The tournament took place at the Crondon Park Golf Club in Essex.

Groups

The groups were as follows:

Note: Bold indicates group winner, italics indicate the eliminated players. In groups 1–7, players were eliminated for finishing in the bottom two of the league and in group 8, the players are eliminated for finishing in the bottom four and losing in the semi finals and the final of the Group 8 playoff. Although in the Winners Group players are out of contention for the title for failing to win outright.

Results

Group One
Tuesday September 15

Group Results

Play-Offs

Group Two
Wednesday September 16

Group Results

Play-Offs

Group Three
Thursday September 17

Group Results

Play-Offs

Group Four
Tuesday September 22

Group Results

Play-Offs

Group Five
Wednesday September 23

Group Results

Play-Offs

Group Six
Thursday September 24

Group Results

Play-Offs

Group Seven
Tuesday October 20

Group Results

Play-Offs

Group Eight
Wednesday October 21

Group Results

Play-Offs

Winners Group
Thursday October 22

Group Results

Play-Offs

References

Championship League Darts
Championship League Darts